Raghavji (born 7 July 1934) is an Indian politician. He was a member of Madhya Pradesh Vidhan Sabha from Vidisha. He had been a member of the Lok Sabha and the Rajya Sabha. He served as a cabinet minister (finance minister) in the Bharatiya Janata Party ministry in Madhya Pradesh state until early July 2013. He resigned over allegations of sexually harassing domestic help on 5 July 2013. He was expelled from the BJP and later arrested from an apartment in Bhopal on 5 July 2013.

References

External links 
 Profile (Hindi) on MP Vidhan Sabha website
 Assets and Liabilities declaration

Living people
1934 births
Madhya Pradesh MLAs 2008–2013
Bharatiya Janata Party politicians from Madhya Pradesh
India MPs 1977–1979
India MPs 1989–1991
People from Vidisha
Rajya Sabha members from Madhya Pradesh
State cabinet ministers of Madhya Pradesh
Lok Sabha members from Madhya Pradesh
Janata Party politicians